Sam Taylor (August 13, 1895 – March 6, 1958) was an American film director, screenwriter, and producer, most active in the silent film era. Taylor is best known for his comedic directorial work with Harold Lloyd and Mary Pickford, and also later worked with Laurel and Hardy. He was born in New York City.

A notorious cinematic legend over the decades has suggested that Taylor's 1929 adaptation of Shakespeare's The Taming of the Shrew had the screen credit "additional dialogue by Sam Taylor".  However, no extant prints of the film contain this credit, and there is no documentary evidence that it ever existed.

Taylor directed seven feature films with Lloyd as star, second only to Fred C. Newmeyer (the two co-directed Lloyd in five features). He also directed Pickford in her first "talkie" feature with Coquette (1929), which garnered the latter an Academy Award. 

Taylor died at the age of 62 in Santa Monica, California.

Partial filmography

 Over the Garden Wall (1919)
 In Honor's Web (1919)
 Human Collateral (1920)
 Now or Never (1921)
 Never Weaken (1921)
 Princess Jones (1921)
 The Mohican's Daughter (1922)
 Safety Last! (1923)
 Why Worry? (1923)
 Girl Shy (1924)
 The Freshman (1925)
 Exit Smiling (1927)
 My Best Girl (1927)
 Tempest (1928)
 The Woman Disputed (1928)
 Lady of the Pavements (1929)
 The Taming of the Shrew (1929)
 Coquette (1929)
 Du Barry, Woman of Passion (1930)
 Skyline (1931)
 Ambassador Bill (1931)
 Kiki (1931)
 Devil's Lottery (1932)
 Out All Night (1933)
 The Cat's-Paw (1934)
 Nothing but Trouble (1944)

External links

American film directors
American film producers
American male screenwriters
1895 births
1958 deaths
20th-century American male writers
20th-century American screenwriters